Two-time defending champion Shingo Kunieda and his partner Frédéric Cattaneo defeated Michael Jérémiasz and Stefan Olsson in the final, 3–6, 7–6(7–3), [10–6] to win the men's doubles wheelchair tennis title at the 2012 French Open.

Kunieda and Nicolas Peifer were the reigning champions, but Peifer withdrew due to a right-hand injury.

Seeds
  Stéphane Houdet /  Maikel Scheffers (semifinals)
  Robin Ammerlaan /  Ronald Vink (semifinals)

Draw

Finals

References
Main Draw

Wheelchair Men's Doubles
French Open, 2012 Men's Doubles